Isabel Seal Stovel (May 25, 1882 – November 29, 1960) was one of organizers of the City of San Francisco Music Week.

Early life
Stovel was born on May 25, 1882, in Oakland, California, the daughter of Alfred Blake Seal and Jessie Livingstone Cobbledick.

Career
She spent three years in travel and study. She was a musician and teacher of violin. From 1914 to 1918 she worked for the Violin Department at the Oakland Settlement, in Oakland, California. Starting from 1922 she worked for the Violin Department at the Dominican College, in San Rafael, California. 

She was the secretary of the San Francisco Civic Association for Maintaining Welfare and Recreation Work in the Army and Navy hospitals, prisons, and other institutions. She was the secretary and one of organizers of the City of San Francisco Music Week which became a national movement. 

She was the treasurer of the San Francisco Chapter of Pro-Musica Inc. for the Advancement of Modern Music.

She was a member of the Pacific Musical Society, the San Francisco Musical Club, the San Francisco Music Teachers Association, the League of Business and Professional Women.

Personal life
Stovel moved to San Francisco in 1903 and lived at 607 Third Ave., San Francisco, California. On January 31, 1906, she married Hubert Roy Stovel.

She died on November 29, 1960, and is buried at Mountain View Cemetery (Oakland, California).

References

People from Oakland, California
1882 births
1960 deaths